Aleksandar Matanović (born May 23, 1930) is a Serbian chess grandmaster. Following the death of Yuri Averbakh at the age of 100 on May 7, 2022, Matanović became the oldest living grandmaster.

Chess career
Awarded the GM title in 1955, Matanović was junior champion of Yugoslavia in 1948 and Yugoslav national champion in 1962 (joint with Minić), 1969 and 1978 (he took second place in 1951, 1956, 1959 and 1967).

His main tournament results include second place at the Vrnjacka Banja zonal tournament 1967, first place at Opatija 1953, second at Belgrade 1954, first at Hamburg 1955, first at Beverwijk 1957, tied for first at Buenos Aires 1961, first at Zevenaar 1961 and second at Jerusalem 1964. He has an Elo rating of 2490, and is one of just a few living players in the world with Morphy Number 3.

Matanović is the author of leading chess encyclopedias and Editor-in-Chief of Chess Informant.

Other
Matanović has also been a radio announcer and producer.

Books
 Encyclopedia of Chess Openings (five volumes), Chess Informant
 Encyclopedia of Chess Endings (five volumes), Chess Informant
 Chess as a Destiny

Citations

References

 Adriano Chicco, Giorgio Porreca: Dizionario enciclopedico degli scacchi, Mursia, Milano 1971.

External links
  
  (645 games)

1930 births
Living people
Sportspeople from Belgrade
Chess grandmasters
Serbian chess players
Yugoslav chess players
Serbian chess writers